Kanazawa is a major city in Ishikawa Prefecture, Japan. The term Kanazawa may also refer to:

Kanazawa Castle
Kanazawa College of Art
Kanazawa Samuraiz basketball team
Kanazawa Soccer Stadium
Kanazawa Station
Kanazawa (surname)
Kanazawa University
Kanazawa-ku, Yokohama
Zweigen Kanazawa